The Virginia Slims of Akron, also known during the first two editions as the Akron Tennis Open, is a defunct WTA Tour affiliated women's tennis tournament played from 1973 to 1976. It was held in Akron, Ohio in the United States and played on indoor carpet courts.

Past finals

Singles

Doubles

References

External links
 WTA Results Archive

Indoor tennis tournaments
Carpet court tennis tournaments
Defunct tennis tournaments in the United States
Virginia Slims tennis tournaments
1973 establishments in Ohio
1976 disestablishments in Ohio
Recurring sporting events established in 1973
Recurring sporting events disestablished in 1976
History of women in Ohio